CKY2 may refer to"

 CKY (videos) (Camp Kill Yourself), a series of videos by Bam Margera and Brandon DiCamillo
 Whitewood Airport, the ICAO airport code for the airport in Canada